The LG G Pro 2 is an Android phablet smartphone produced by LG Electronics. Serving as a successor to the LG Optimus G Pro, it was unveiled in February 2014 during the 2014 Mobile World Congress in Barcelona, Spain.
The phone comes in white or black. It has two RGB notification LEDs, one on the front and another on the back in the power button. It also supports the SlimPort video out standard. The volume and power buttons are at the back for easy accessibility with the index finger. The display is 5.9 inches diagonally - with an unusually wide screen of 82 mm / 3.22 inches.

See also
LG G series
LG G2
LG Optimus G Pro
LG G Pro Lite

References

Android (operating system) devices
LG Electronics smartphones
Phablets
Mobile phones with 4K video recording
Discontinued smartphones
Mobile phones with infrared transmitter